The 1992–1993 Highland Football League was won by Elgin City, who were later stripped of the title after dishonesty requesting a game be brought forward, resulting in two players —who would have been ineligible— being allowed to play. Therefore, the title was void.

Table

Highland Football League seasons
4